Sébastien Jumel (born 20 December 1971) is a French politician and a member of the French Communist Party (PCF).

Jumel was elected general councillor for the Canton of Dieppe-Ouest in 2002 following a by-election, and became a vice-president in the left-wing majority in the Seine-Maritime general council in 2004. In 2008, he was elected mayor of Dieppe by the first round with 55.5% of the vote against 40.7% for the opposition. One week later, he was elected general councillor for Dieppe-Ouest.

He is considered a rising star in the French Communist Party, and in 2010, he was selected to be the candidate of the Left Front in Upper Normandy for the 2010 regional elections.

References

1971 births
Living people
Deputies of the 15th National Assembly of the French Fifth Republic
Deputies of the 16th National Assembly of the French Fifth Republic
French Communist Party politicians
Mayors of places in Normandy
Politicians from Normandy
People from Seine-Maritime
Aix-Marseille University alumni